The Dutch Waterski Association (NWB) is a union of all Dutch water ski, wakeboard, cable skiing and water sports clubs and organisations. The association's goal is to promote the sport of water skiing and wakeboarding. It organises competition, subsidies, training and scouting, and coordinates sending skiers to international sport events. 

The Dutch Waterski Association is a member organization of the International Water Ski Federation.

External links 
 Nederlandse Waterski Bond (www.waterskibond.nl)

Wat
Wakeboarding
Waterskiing
Water sports in the Netherlands